Nairn (Triple Nickel) Aerodrome  is a registered aerodrome located  southwest of Nairn, Ontario, Canada.

References

Registered aerodromes in Ontario